East 79th (signed as East 79th Street) is a station on the RTA Red Line in Cleveland, Ohio. It is located on the west side of East 79th Street between Woodland Avenue and Grand Avenue. The entrance is on the east side of East 79th Street.

The station opened along with CTS Rapid Transit on March 15, 1955. It originally served nearby industrial facilities, such as the Van Dorn Company, as well as a connection for the East 79th Street bus line. With the closing of most of the industrial facilities adjacent to the station, passenger boardings have decreased so that it has become one of the least used stations on the Red Line. RTA has considered closing the station or moving it to the intersection of Woodland Avenue and Buckeye Road. In early 2020, the RTA made the decision to renovate the station, with construction scheduled to finish in the summer of 2021. The station renovation was completed ahead of schedule, and reopened on March 10, 2021.

Station layout

References

External links

East 079th Street (RTA Red Line Rapid Transit station)
Railway stations in the United States opened in 1955
Central, Cleveland
1955 establishments in Ohio